In mathematics, the Hurwitz problem (named after Adolf Hurwitz) is the problem of finding multiplicative relations between quadratic forms which generalise those known to exist between sums of squares in certain numbers of variables.

Description
There are well-known multiplicative relationships between sums of squares in two variables

(known as the Brahmagupta–Fibonacci identity), and also Euler's four-square identity and Degen's eight-square identity. These may be interpreted as multiplicativity for the norms on the complex numbers ), quaternions, and octonions, respectively.

The Hurwitz problem for the field  is to find general relations of the form

We call a triple  admissible for  if such an identity exists. It is believed that otherwise admissibility is independent of the field of definition.

The Hurwitz–Radon theorem 

The "Hurwitz–Radon" problem is that of finding admissible triples of the form  Obviously  is admissible.

Other admissible triples include  and

See also
 Composition algebra
 Hurwitz's theorem (normed division algebras)
 Radon–Hurwitz number

References

Field (mathematics)
Quadratic forms
Mathematical problems